The Islamic State dinar, also simply the gold dinar, is the de jure currency of the Islamic State, a terrorist organization and former proto-state from 2014 to 2019. It is subdivided into dirhams and fulûs, and it has its origins in the historical gold dinar.

Background 
The Islamic State is a terrorist organization that split off from al-Qaeda in 2013, establishing itself as the Islamic State of Iraq and Syria, and then the Islamic State in June 2014. By 2015, it controlled a large amount of territory in Iraq and Syria.

IS announced its plans to mint their own currency on a 2014 issue of its magazine, Dabiq. The design of coins made of gold, silver and copper was published. In 2015, a video released by ISIL, The Rise of the Khilafah and the Return of the Gold Dinar where it was announced that these coins were set for release. The planned exchange rate to the U.S. dollar was approximately 139 USD to 1 gold dinar. Experts considered  2 options for the emergence of such a currency: for propaganda purposes; or an attempt to emphasize the statehood of the so-called state. According to IS releases - the intent behind the coinage would have allowed states to be independent of the influence of the West on the Islamic world. In 2015, Turkish Police found an underground mint in Şahinbey, a town near Gaziantep, both near the Syrian border.

De facto, however, the currency saw limited circulation. In the areas where it saw circulation, it was forbidden to use other currencies, sometimes with the exception of the dollar. Other areas saw the use of different types of currencies such as the Syrian pound and the Iraqi dinar.

Coins 
A series of coins divided between gold dinars, silver dirhams and copper fulûs were released, seeing limited circulation in Syria, with locals' Syrian pounds were taken away and replaced with the dinar in some occasions.

There have also been reports that indicate that the coinage publicized by the group has differed greatly in its actual circulation.

Coins

See also 
 Territory of the Islamic State
 Finances of the Islamic State
 Terrorism financing

References 

Islamic State of Iraq and the Levant
Funding of terrorism
Currencies of Syria
Currencies of Iraq
Currencies introduced in 2015
Circulating currencies
Dinar
Gold coins
Silver coins
Copper coins